Lares District is one of eight districts of the province Calca in Peru.

Geography 
The Urupampa mountain range traverses the district. Other mountains are listed below:

Ethnic groups 
The people in the district are mainly indigenous citizens of Quechua descent. Quechua is the language which the majority of the population (94.91%) learnt to speak in childhood, 4.77% of the residents started speaking using the Spanish language (2007 Peru Census).

See also 
 Killaqucha
 Qiwñaqucha
 Sallqaqucha Wallata Warak'ay

References